Injipuli is a dark brown sweet-sour and spicy curry made of ginger, tamarind, green chillies and jaggery mainly prepared in Kerala during Onam. It is also a part of Tamil Nadu cuisine. It is also known as puli inji in some parts of Kerala, South India.

It is served as part of the Sadhya, or virunthu by the Tamil community.

See also
 Cuisine of Kerala
 Sadhya

References

External links
 Different Type of PuliInji

Indian curries
Kerala cuisine